Igor Sergeyevich Strelbin (16 September 1974 – 3 January 2018) was a Russian professional footballer. He died on 3 January 2018 at the age of 43 after a serious illness.

Club career
He played 3 seasons in the Russian Football National League for FC Dynamo Makhachkala and FC Mashuk-KMV Pyatigorsk.

References

1974 births
2018 deaths
Sportspeople from Bryansk
Russian footballers
Association football midfielders
FC Dynamo Bryansk players
FC Atyrau players
FC Sever Murmansk players
Kazakhstan Premier League players
Russian expatriate footballers
Expatriate footballers in Kazakhstan
Russian expatriate sportspeople in Kazakhstan
FC Mashuk-KMV Pyatigorsk players
FC Dynamo Makhachkala players